Hillsboro is an unincorporated community in Fleming County, Kentucky, United States.

History
First called Foudraysville for the Foudray family of early settlers, it was renamed Hillsboro when the post office opened in 1833. In 1874 a fire was started by robbers, burning several buildings in the center of town, among them being E. G. SHIELDS' store, J. W. CRAIN'S store, the wholesale house of J.A.H. KERNS, and the drugstore of L. J. JONES. The buildings, however, were all replaced after the first fire. In 1917 a second fire burned the buildings located in the same area.

Hillsboro Covered Bridge, which is listed on the National Register of Historic Places, is located in Hillsboro.

References

Unincorporated communities in Fleming County, Kentucky
Unincorporated communities in Kentucky